There was a series of battles that took place in 1697 when the Venetian fleet, under Bartolomeo Contarini, hunted down the Turkish fleet in the Aegean Sea.

Actions

The actions took place on 6 July near Lemnos, on 1 September between Andros and Euboea, and on 20 September south of Euboea. Both sides had about twenty-six battleships as well as several smaller vessels. Casualties for Venice were seventy-one killed and 163 wounded in the first battle and 191 killed and 516 wounded in the last.

Order of battle

Venice
(The number after the name refers to the number of cannon in the ship's main armament.)

San Lorenzo Giustinian 70/80 (flag)
Aurora 80
San Domenico 60
Valor Coronado 54
Nettuno 50/60
Rosa 60
Fenice 56
Fede Guerriera 56
Iride 60/66
San Sebastiano 68 - Blew up, 1 (or 2?) September
Tigre 66
Giove 64
Sole d'Oro 70
Rizzo d'Oro (not in 1st battle)
Amazzone Guerriera (not in first battle)
Redentore del Mundo 70
Venere Armata 52
Vittoria 50/60
San Nicolo 54
Sacra Lega 60
San Andrea 60
Ercole Vittorioso 50/60
Pace ed Abbondanza 50
San Vittorio 62
San Giovanni Battista Grande 60
Madonna della Salute 50
Fama Volante 50
Cavallo Marino (merchantman)
Madonna del Rosario (merchantman)
? (fireship) - Expended 20 September
? (fireship)
several galliots and galleys (one of each captured during the first battle)

Ottoman Empire
1 3-decker battleship (likely to have been a seventy or eighty gunner)
25 other battleships (likely to have been fifty to sixty four gunners) 
19 galliots (more galliots joined before the third battle)
2 fireships

References
 

Conflicts in 1697
Battles of the Great Turkish War
1697
1697
1690s in the Ottoman Empire
17th century in Greece
1697 in Europe